Carlo Allegretti (16th-17th century) was an Italian painter, mainly of sacred subjects.

Biography
Allegretti was born in Monteprandone, and trained in Venice, following the style of Giacomo Bassano. In the Province of Ascoli, he left a number of works including in the church of San Agostino in Monteprandone, an Offida and an Adoration of the Magi; in the church of San Bartolomeo at Ascoli Piceno, a Martyrdom of San Bartholomew (1605-8). His masterwork is considered to be the triptych of the Adoration of the Magi (1611) in the Cathedral of Sant'Emidio at Ascoli Piceno.

References

16th-century Italian painters
Italian male painters
17th-century Italian painters
Painters from Venice
People from Ascoli Piceno